Casnovia can refer to a location in the United States:

 Casnovia, Michigan, a village
 Casnovia Township, Michigan

See also

Cazenovia (disambiguation)
Cazenove (disambiguation)